The 2018 Tour of Belgium, known as the 2018 Baloise Belgium Tour for sponsorship purposes, was the 88th edition of the Tour of Belgium cycling stage race. It took place from 23 to 27 May 2018 in Belgium, as part of the 2018 UCI Europe Tour; it was categorised as a 2.HC race. Jens Keukeleire successfully defended his title, winning the race for a second consecutive year.

Teams
20 teams were selected to take part in Tour of Belgium. Three of these were UCI WorldTeams, with eleven UCI Professional Continental teams, five UCI Continental teams and a team representing the Belgium national team.

Schedule

Stages

Stage 1
23 May 2018 — Buggenhout to Buggenhout,

Stage 2
24 May 2018 — Lochristi to Knokke-Heist,

Stage 3
25 May 2018 — Bornem to Bornem, individual time trial (ITT)

Stage 4
26 May 2018 — Wanze to Wanze,

Stage 5
27 May 2018 — Landen to Tongeren,

Classification leadership table
In the 2018 Tour of Belgium, three different jerseys were awarded. The general classification was calculated by adding each cyclist's finishing times on each stage. Time bonuses were awarded to the first three finishers on all stages: the stage winner won a ten-second bonus, with six and four seconds for the second and third riders respectively. Bonus seconds were also awarded to the first three riders at sprints in the "golden kilometre", where three intermediate sprint positions were held within the space of a kilometre. Three seconds were awarded for the winner of the sprint, two seconds for the rider in second and one second for the rider in third. The leader of the general classification received a blue jersey. This classification was considered the most important of the 2018 Tour of Belgium, and the winner of the classification was considered the winner of the race.

The second classification was the points classification. Riders were awarded points for finishing in the top ten in a stage. Unlike in the points classification in the Tour de France, the winners of all stages were awarded the same number of points.  The leader of the points classification was awarded a red jersey.
There was also a combativity classification, where riders received points for finishing in the top five at intermediate sprint points during each stage, on a 10–8–6–4–2 scale. Bonus points were awarded if a breakaway had gained a sufficient advantage over the field, up to a maximum of 5 points. There was also a classification for teams, in which the times of the best three cyclists in a team on each stage were added together; the leading team at the end of the race was the team with the lowest cumulative time.

References

External links

2018
2018 in Belgian sport
2018 UCI Europe Tour